Ranks and insignia of Organisation Todt show the pay grades, wage groups and paramilitary ranks used by the Organisation Todt.

Ranks and Pay Grades of OT Organic Staff

Source:

Ranks and Wage Groups of OT Contractor Staff

Sources:

Wage groups for front workers and OT legionaries 

Source:

Rank insignia

References

Nazi paramilitary ranks